Durlabhpur (also spelled Durlovpur) is a village in the Gangajalghati CD block in the Bankura Sadar subdivision of the Bankura district  in the state of West Bengal, India.

Geography

Location
Durlabhpur is located at

Area overview
The map alongside shows the Bankura Sadar subdivision of Bankura district. Physiographically, this area is part of the Bankura Uplands in the west gradually merging with the Bankura-Bishnupur Rarh Plains in the north-east. The western portions are characterised by undulating terrain with many hills and ridges. The area is having a gradual descent from the Chota Nagpur Plateau. The soil is laterite red and hard beds are covered with scrub jungle and sal wood. Gradually it gives way to just uneven rolling lands but the soil continues to be lateritic. There are coal mines in the northern part, along the Damodar River. It is a predominantly rural area with 89% of the population living in rural areas and only 11% living in the urban areas.

Note: The map alongside presents some of the notable locations in the subdivision. All places marked in the map are linked in the larger full screen map.

Demographics
According to the 2011 Census of India Durlabhpur had a total population of 1,725 of which 894 (52%) were males and 831 (48%) were females. Population below 6 years was 172. The total number of literates in Durlovpur was 1086 (69.93% of the population over 6 years).

Economy

Mejia Thermal Power Station
In 1996, Mejia Thermal Power Station was set up by Damodar Valley Corporation at Durlabhpur. It has an installed capacity of 2340 MW – 4 units of 210 MW each, 2 units of 250 MW each and 2 units of 500 MW each.

Lafarge cement
Nuvoco Cements, manufacturer of Lafarge cement products, is located at Murra, nearby.

Transport
National Highway 14, (old numbering NH 60), running from Morgram to Kharagpur, and Durgapur-Purulia Road pass through Durlavpur.

Education
DAV Public School is an English-medium coeducational institution established in 1997. It is a senior secondary school following the Central Board of Secondary Education syllabus.

Latiaboni Anchal High School is a Bengali-medium coeducational institution established in 1964. It has facilities for teaching from class V to class XII. The school has 18 computers, a library with 920 books and a playground.

St. Johns School is an English-medium coeducational school established in 1990. It has facilities for teaching from class I to class VIII.

References

Villages in Bankura district